Gogolev, feminine: Gogoleva is a surname. It may refer to:

 Alexander Gogolev (born 1992), Russian ice hockey player
 Dmitri Gogolev (born 1972), Russian ice hockey player
 Elena Gogoleva (1900–1993), Russian actress
 Stephen Gogolev (born 2004), Canadian figure skater
 Vasily Gogolev (born 1957), Russian wrestler

See also
 

Russian-language surnames